Common names: (Two-striped forest pitviper).
Bothrops bilineatus smaragdinus is a venomous pitviper subspecies found in the northern and western Amazon region of South America.

Description
Same as for B. b. bilineatus, except that it lacks any dark vertical stripes on the supralabial scales and its green dorsal ground color is only patterned only with a peppering of black specks (no tan or reddish brown spots present).

Geographic range
Found in South America in the Amazon regions of Southern Colombia (Departments of Putumayo, Amazonas, Southern Caqueta and Guaviare), southern Venezuela, northern and western Brazil, Ecuador, Peru and Bolivia. The type locality given is "upper Purús river, State Amazonas, Brasil."

References

External links
 

bilineatus smaragdinus
Snakes of South America
Reptiles of Bolivia
Reptiles of Brazil
Reptiles of Colombia
Reptiles of Peru
Reptiles of Venezuela
Fauna of the Amazon
Reptiles described in 1966